Sierra Velluda is a massive Pleistocene stratovolcano located immediately southwest of the Antuco Volcano, in the Bío Bío Region of Chile. The heavily glaciated mountain has two main summits and is the tallest mountain in Laguna del Laja National Park.

Sierra Velluda was formed in two stages. The second is dated to 381,000 years ago and is made out of  breccia and lava. Subsequently, glacial erosion exposed the older layers.

See also
 List of Ultras of South America

References

Volcanoes of Biobío Region
Velluda Sierra
Three-thousanders of the Andes
Pleistocene stratovolcanoes
Stratovolcanoes of Chile